Agar-Ellis is a surname, and may refer to:

 George Agar-Ellis, 1st Baron Dover (1797–1833), English man of letters
 Henry Agar-Ellis, 3rd Viscount Clifden (1825–1866), Irish courtier and race horse owner

See also

 Agar (disambiguation)
 Ellis

Surnames of English origin
Compound surnames